= Giovanni Giandomenici =

Dutch fencer

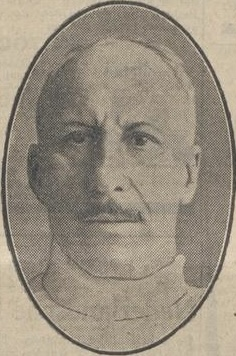

Personal information
- Nationality: Italian
- Died: July 1932

Sport
- Sport: Fencing

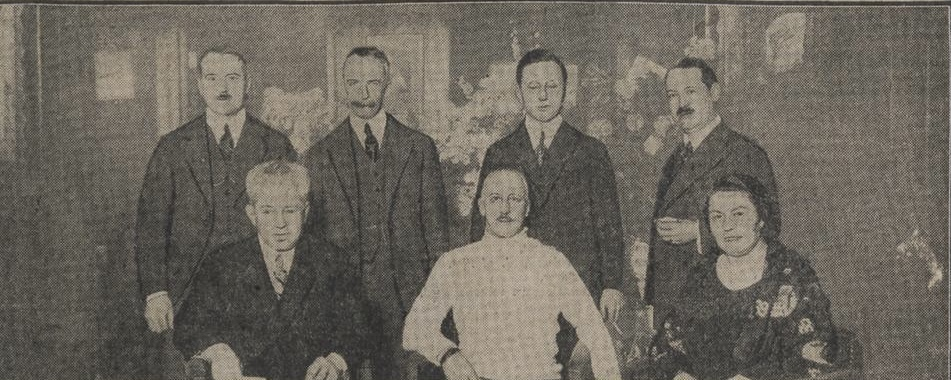
Tribute to fencing teacher Giandomenici in February 1925 in Amsterdam

Giovanni Giandomenici (died July 1932) was an Italian fencer and fencing master. He became a known fencing teacher in the Netherlands where he had his first group of pupils in 1910. He founded his own fencing house in Amsterdam. There he trained known fencers, including Olympic medalists and national amateur champions. He also introduced with great success women’s fencing in the Netherlands In 1925 his 25th anniversary as fencing master was celebrated. In 1931 he retired and moved back to Italy. Giandomenici died in Italy a year later, in July 1932.
